Full Circle is an album by American pianist David Benoit released in 2006, and recorded for the Peak label. The album reached #7 on Billboards contemporary Jazz chart.

Track listing
All tracks written by David Benoit; except as noted.
"Cafe Rio" - 4:20
"First Day of School" - 4:08
"Agua de Beber" (Antônio Carlos Jobim, Vinicius de Moraes) - 3:57
"Beat Street" (David Benoit, Jeff Lorber) - 4:15
"Six P.M. "- 4:40
"Chasing the Tides" - 4:53
"Neat With a Twist" (David Benoit, Jeff Lorber) - 5:16
"Katrina's Little Bear" - 3:47
"Yusuke the Ghost" - 3:36
"Monster in the Attic" - 4:35

 Personnel 
 David Benoit – acoustic piano (1-10), arrangements (1-10), keyboards (2, 6, 8, 9, 10), Hammond B3 organ (10)
 Jeff Lorber – Fender Rhodes (4, 7), synthesizers (4, 7), drum programming (4, 7), arrangements (4, 7)
 Oscar Castro-Neves – acoustic guitar (1, 5)
 Paul Brown – acoustic guitar (2), arrangements (2, 3, 6), guitar solo (3)
 Pat Kelly – guitar (2, 6), acoustic guitar (8)
 Dwight Sills – guitar (4, 7)
 Paul Jackson, Jr. – electric guitar (10)
 Nathan East – bass (1, 10)
 Roberto Vally – bass (2, 3, 6)
 Alex Al – bass (4, 7)
 Brian Bromberg – acoustic bass (5, 9), bass (8)
 John Robinson – drums (1, 2, 3, 5, 6, 8, 9, 10)
 Michael White – drums (4, 7)
 Alex Acuna – percussion (1, 5)
 Luis Conte – percussion (1, 2, 3, 5, 6, 8, 9, 10)
 Dan Higgins – saxophone (3), flute (3)
 Gary Meek – saxophone (4, 7)
 Andy Suzuki – tenor saxophone (5)
 Euge Groove – saxophone (6)
 Bill Reichenbach, Jr. – trombone (3)
 Jerry Hey – trumpet (3), horn arrangements (3)
 Ron King – trumpet (4, 7)
 Rick Braun - trumpet (5)
 Tim Weisberg – flute (5)
 Tim Landauer – cello (8)

 Production 
 Jeffrey Weber – producer (1, 5, 8, 9, 10)
 Paul Brown – producer (2, 3, 6), mixing (2, 3, 4, 6)
 Jeff Lorber – producer (4, 7), engineer (4, 7), recording (4, 7)
 David Benoit – executive producer 
 Andi Howard – executive producer
 Ron Moss – executive producer, management 
 Mark Wexler – executive producer
 Clark Germain – recording (1, 2, 3, 5, 6, 8, 9, 10), mixing (1, 5, 8, 9, 10), piano recording (4, 7)
 Dragan "DC" Capor – recording (2, 3, 6), mixing (2, 3, 4, 6)
 Dwight Sills – engineer (4, 7), recording (4, 7)
 Michael White – engineer (4, 7), recording (4, 7)
 Chris Bellman – mastering 
 Anna Stromberg – music preparation 
 William Stromberg – music preparation
 Eric Stonebrook – music preparation
 Janis Stonebrook – music preparation
 Michael Clark – score supervision 
 Valerie Ince – A&R coordinator
 Yvonne Wish – production coordinator 
 Abbey Anna – art direction 
 Andrew Pham – art direction, package design 
 Sonny Mediana – group photography 
 Carl Studna – solo photographyStudios'
 Recorded at Ocean Way Recording (Hollywood, CA); JHL Sound (Pacific Palisades, CA); Funky Joint Studios (Sherman Oaks, CA).
 Mixed at Ocean Way Recording and Funky Joint Studios.
 Mastered at Bernie Grundman Mastering (Hollywood, CA).

Charts

References

External links
David Benoit/Full Circle at Discogs
David Benoit/Full Circle at AllMusic
David Benoit's Official Site

2006 albums
David Benoit (musician) albums
Peak Records albums